Adderley Street is a street in Cape Town, South Africa. It is considered the main street of the central business district (downtown) of Cape Town. The Christmas lights, night markets, main train station and numerous shops and restaurants and office towers are on this thoroughfare.

History

The street was originally named Heerengracht, after the canal ("gracht") which ran down its centre, and which had its origins in the rivers from Table Mountain. At the time the street was more of a wide walkway beside the canal, which was crossed by various stone bridges.

The network of canals were covered over, throughout Cape Town, in the 1860s. The Heerengracht river and canal therefore became an underground pipe-line. For many years the street was residential, lined with large oak trees, but by 1850 it had become strongly commercial in character.

Mayor Hercules Jarvis named it Adderley Street in 1850, to honour British Parliamentarian Charles Bowyer Adderley (elevated to the peerage as Baron Norton in 1878) who fought successfully against the plan for the British government to make Cape Town into another penal colony.

Adderley Street was the original main street of the city centre shopping district with large department stores such as Stuttafords (SW corner of Hout Street, going through to St Georges Mall, now Edgars et al.), Garlicks (at Exchange Place across from Cape Town railway station), Fletcher & Cartwrights, and Thomas, Watson & Co. In the late 1800s the street was a "riot of ornament" along which around 150 retail shops plied their trade, many with wrought iron decorating the outsides of their buildings. The street remains a retail centre today, with branches of Woolworths, Edgars, Truworths and shopping centres such as the Golden Acre with Ackermans, Shoprite and Mr Price.

It also has long been a financial centre with the Colonial Bank located on the site of the Stuttafords Building until 1890, and the imposing Standard Bank Building on the east side at Hout Street. The upper end marked political and religious authority, the location of St. George's Cathedral and the Supreme Court of South Africa.

Gallery

See also 
 Slave Lodge
 Company's Garden
 Groote Kerk
 Cape Town railway station

References

External links

South Africa online travel guide - Adderley Street
 Turtle Essays

Streets in Cape Town
Shopping districts and streets in South Africa